Hildebrand Dezső Várkonyi (3 August 1888 – 20 May 1971) was a monk and a teacher of Bencés order. Várkonyi was a respected and well-known Hungarian philosopher, pedagogue and psychologist.

He was elected a private teacher at the Magyar Királyi Szent Erzsébet Tudományegyetem (Hungarian Royal Saint Elisabeth University) in Pécs. Later, between 1929-40 he became the head of Pedagogical and Psychological Instituti on at the University of Szeged. From 1940 Várkonyi was a professor in Kolozsvár and later in Budapest.

Career 

Várkonyi pursued his academic studies at The Teacher Training College of Bencés Abbey in Pannonhalma between 1906–1911 and graduated of a secondary school teacher (qualification). He accomplished his doctoral studies at the University of Budapest in 1913 and became a private teacher in University of Pécs. Between 1928-29 he was on a studytour in Sorbonne in Paris.

Várkonyi was promoted a university professor on 27 December 1929, and from this time he was the Head of Pedagogical and Psychological Institution at Ferenc József University in Szeged, where he held the Dean's Office for years. Between 1930-1940 Paul Schiller Harkai, László Tihamér Kiss, Hildebrand Dezső Várkonyi and Ferenc Mérei (he does after 1945) was in Hungary Jean Piaget's theories of psychological popularizers.

On 19 October 1940 Várkonyi moved to Kolozsvár to teach at the Hungarian Royal Franz Joseph University, which had just then been reorganised. In Kolozsvár he was the Head of Psychological Institution for 7 semesters. Várkonyi fled to Budapest towards the end of the Second World War. In 1947 he left Bencés Order because started a family. He acquired a degree of academy of sciences in 1952 in accordance with the new academic system that was based on the Soviet model. He was a professor at the University of Budapest until his retirement in 1954.

Work 

"I do not doubt that it is humanity again after the big crises of our age the ghost and truth will yearn and after the treasures of the soul, than himself Pascal and his age."

Besides being a teacher, Várkonyi was a researcher into philosophy, pedagogy, psychology and infant behaviourism. Among his well-known students were Viola Tomori and Béla Reitzer. Other famous Hungarians such as Miklós Radnóti, Gyula Ortutay and Dezső Baróti, who were impressed by Várkonyi's intellectuality, attended his lectures. Radnóti, for example, a famous Hungarian poet, was deeply influenced by Várkonyi's lectures on infant behaviourism. Later in his career, Radnóti talks about his gloomy childhood experience in his poems.

Várkonyi continued teaching at the University of Kolozsvár during the years of war.
Várkonyi was a philosopher, psychologist, and a pedagogue in one person. For him philosophy was not only a discipline but a struggle for the answers to the ultimate questions of human existence.

His recollection 

In 1988, on the occasion of the 100. anniversary of his birth Institute of Psychology (Szeged) leader, Lajos Duró and his colleagues published a memory volume of his respect, and name a lecture hall after him. Várkonyi Hildebrand Dezső lecture hall is the integral part of Institute of Psychology today.

In 2008, it was issued on the occasion of the 120. anniversary of his birth Várkonyi Hildebrand Dezső medallion, and it was handed over who makes work willing to make sacrifices on those who are the research of the educational psychology and his disseminations area.

Studies (selection) 

 A tudat fogalmáról. Filozófia-történeti és ismerettani tanulmány. Győr, 1912. (=From the concept of the consciousness. Philosophy story and knowledge doctrine study.)
 A tudati adottság filozófiája. Budapest, 1922. (=The philosophy of the consciousness conditions.)
 Aquinói Szent Tamás filozófiája. Budapest. 1923. (=St. Thomas Aquinas's philosophy.)
 Tér és térszemlélet. Pécs, 1925. (=Space and space-perception.)
 A pszichológia alapvetése. Pécs, 1926. (The establishment of the psychology.)
 Az indukció filozófiája. Pécs, 1927. (=The philosophy of the induction.)
 A lélektan mai állása. Budapest, 1928. (=The today's position of the psychology.)
 Intelligencia (értelem). [Lexikon szócikk.] In Magyar pedagógiai lexikon I. köt. – Bp.: Révai, 1933. 914-915. hasáb. (=Intelligence (sense). [Encyclopaedia dictionary entry.] In Hungarian pedagogic encyclopaedia)
 Tehetség, tehetségesség. [Lexikon szócikk.] In: Magyar pedagógiai lexikon II. köt. – Bp. : Révai, 1934. 784-785. hasáb. (=Talent, talented. [Encyclopaedia dictionary entry.] In: Hungarian pedagogic encyclopaedia.)
 Tehetségesek iskolái. [Lexikon szócikk.] = Magyar pedagógiai lexikon II. köt. – Bp. : Révai, 1934. 785-786. hasáb. (The schools of talented ones. [=Encyclopaedia dictionary entry.] = Hungarian pedagogic encyclopaedia.)
 A cselekvő iskola lélektani alapja. A Cselekvés Iskolája, Szeged, 3. évf. (1934–35) 101. o. (=The psychological basis of the acting school. The school of the act.)
 A kiválasztás és értelmességvizsgálat újabb kérdése. Szeged, 1936. (=The newer question of the selection and an intelligence examination.)
 Bevezetés a neveléslélektanba. Budapest, 1937. (=Introduction into the educational psychology.)
 A nevelés néhány alapelve. Kecskemét, 1939. (=Some basic principles of the upbringing.)
 Védekező magatartások a gyermekkorban. A Cselekvés Iskolája, Szeged, 1939-40. (=Defensive behaviours in the childhood. )
 Fejezetek a serdülés és ifjúkor lélektanából : Lényegszemlélet : Második közlemény. A Cselekvés iskolája, Szeged, [Ablaka ny.] 9. tanév 1940-41. 1-4. sz. (=Chapters from the psychology of the puberty and youth : Essence view : The second is communication. The school of the act.)
 A gyermek testi és lelki fejlődése. Budapest, 1942. (=The child bodily and his spiritual growth.)
 A lelki élet zavarai. Budapest, 1943. (=The disturbances of the spiritual life.)
 Válogatott pedagógiai tanulmányok. Szerző: Makarenko. Ford Szöllősy Klára. Szerk. és az előszót írta Várkonyi H. Dezső egyetemi tanár. Budapest : Új Magyar Könyvkiadó N. V., 1948. pp. 322 (változatlan utánnyomás 1949, 1950.) (=Chosen pedagogic studies.)
 Ranschburg Pál és a magyar gyógypedagógia. Gyógypedagógia, 1960. (=Pál Ranschburg and the Hungarian remedial education. Remedial education.)
 Felfogás és absztrakció. In: Tanítóképző Intézetek Tudományos Közleményei. 6. Debrecen, 1969. (=Notion and abstraction.)
 Naplótöredékek. Budapest, 1973. (=Diary fractions.)

Literature (selection) 

 Magyar Irodalmi lexikon. 3. köt. Budapest, 1965. (=Hungarian literary encyclopaedia.)
 Bardócz András: Várkonyi Hildebrand Dezső tudományos közleményeinek és kéziratainak bibliográfiája. Budapest, Magyar Padagógiai Társaság, 1979. 38 p. (=András Bardócz: Dezső Hildebrand Várkonyi’s bibliography of scientific communications and his manuscripts.)
 Szántó Károly: Várkonyi Hildebrand Dezső életútja és munkássága. Pedagógiai Szemle, 1984. (=Károly Szántó: Dezső Hildebrand Várkonyi’s path of life and his working class.
 Várkonyi Hildebrand Dezső emlékkötet / szerk. Zakar András. Szeged, 1988. (Acta Universitatis Szegediensis de Attila József Nominatae. Sectio Paedagogica et Psychologica, 0324-7260 ; 30.) (=Dezső Hildebrand Várkonyi’s memory volume)

Scientific function 

 Hungarian Psychological Review  (his editor, 1934–1939)

Social membership 

 Hungarian Pedagogic Company
 Hungarian Psychological Company (president, 1940–1947)
 Paedology company (co-chairman)

See also 

Institute of Psychology (Szeged)

References 

 From Hungarian Wikipedia
 Csaba Pléh: Pszichológiatörténet.(=The History of Psychology) Budapest : Gondolat, 1992. Várkonyi see 221. p. 
 Béla Pukánszky: Pedagógia és Pszichológia. = Educational Science and Psychology. l. A Szegedi Tudományegyetem múltja és jelene : 1921-1998 = Past and present of Szeged University. /JATE. Szeged : Officina Ny., 1999. Várkonyi Hildebrand see. 219-221. p.
 Zoltán D. Csomortáni (2009). A Renaissance individuality the XX. in century Hungarian psychology. Dezső Hildebarnd Várkonyi’s life and his working class. In: The Institute of Psychology at the University of Szeged is 80 years old (1929–2009)/ ed. by Ágnes Szokolszky; authors Szokolszky Ágnes, Pataki Márta, Polyák Kamilla et al. Szeged, JATEPress, 2009. 45-71. pp.  
 A lélektan 80 éve a szegedi egyetemen (1929–2009) = 80 years' history of psychology in the University of Szeged. By Pataki M., Polyák K., Németh D., Szokolszky Á. In: Magyar Pszichológiai Szemle/Hungarian Psychological Review, vol. 64. No. 4. December 2009. pp. 671–676.

External links 
 80 years' history of psychology in the University of Szeged, 1929-2009.

Hungarian psychologists
1888 births
1971 deaths
20th-century psychologists